Malaysia have participated in the ABU Radio Song Festival twice. The Malaysian broadcaster, Radio Televisyen Malaysia, has been the organiser of the Malaysian entry since the country's debut in the contest in 2012.

History
Radio Televisyen Malaysia is one of the founder members in the ABU Radio Song Festivals, having participated in the very first ABU Radio Song Festival 2012.

Participation overview 
Table key

See also 
 Malaysia in the ABU TV Song Festival

References 

Countries at the ABU Song Festival